Ninni is a given name and nickname. Notable people with the name include:

Given name
 Ninni Kronberg (1874–1946), Swedish inventor
 Ninni Holmqvist (born 1958), Swedish novelist and translator
Ninni Laaksonen (born 1986), Finnish model, beauty pageant titleholder, and businessperson

Nickname
 Ninni Bruschetta (born Antonino Bruschetta in 1962), Italian actor, director, and screenwriter
 Ninni Cassarà, nickname of Antonino Cassarà (1947–1985), Italian magistrate

See also 
 Nini (disambiguation)
Ninnis (disambiguation)
 Inanna